J.-Clovis-Laflamme Ecological Reserve is an ecological reserve in Quebec, Canada. It was established on

References

External links
 Official website from Government of Québec

Nature reserves in Quebec
Protected areas established in 1991
Protected areas of Saguenay–Lac-Saint-Jean
1991 establishments in Quebec